Andrew J. Higgins may refer to:
Andrew Jackson Higgins or Andrew Higgins (1886–1952),  American shipbuilder
Andrew Jackson Higgins (judge) (born 1921), American judge
USNS Andrew J. Higgins, United States Navy replenishment oiler